Émile Mâle (2 June 1862 – 6 October 1954) was a French art historian, one of the first to study medieval, mostly sacral French art and the influence of Eastern European iconography thereon. He was a member of the Académie française, and a director of the Académie de France à Rome.

Biography
Mâle was born in Commentry, Auvergne. A pupil at the École normale supérieure, he received his degree in 1886. He taught rhetoric at Saint-Étienne, then at the University of Toulouse. He received his doctorate in 1899. Having taught a course in the history of Christian art at the Sorbonne since 1906, he held the chair in history of art there from 1912. He was the successor to Louis Duchesne as head of the French Academy in Rome, 1923–1937.  Among Mâle's many contributions to the understanding of the art of bygone eras were his explanations of iconography and the use of allegory in religious art.

In particular, his doctoral thesis on the Gothic art of France (revised over three editions) L'Art religieux du XIIIe siècle en France (1899) translated into English as The Gothic Image: Religious Art in France of the Thirteenth Century from the third edition of 1910 (or omitting "The Gothic Image" from title, especially in the US) remains in print.

He died in Fontaine-Chaalis, Oise.

Honours
Member of the Académie des Inscriptions et Belles-Lettres (1918)
Member of the Académie royale de Belgique
Member of the British Academy
Member of the Académie française
Grand officier of the Légion d'honneur

Works
Quomodo Sybillas recentiores artifices representaverint (1899)
L'Art religieux du XIIIe siècle en France (1899) - doctoral thesis. Translated into English as The Gothic Image: Religious Art in France of the Thirteenth Century from 3rd edition of 1910, 1913, Dent & Co., London, Dover Books US (omitting "The Gothic Image" from title, still in print), and other editions. Translated into German by Lorenz Zuckermandel as Die kirchliche Kunst des XIII. Jahrhunderts in Frankreich: Studie über die Ikonographie des Mittelalters und ihre Quellen. Straßburg: Verlag J. H. Ed. Heitz, 1907.
L'Art religieux de la fin du Moyen Âge en France (1908) also in English, Princeton 1986, Religious Art in France: The Late Middle Ages: A Study of Medieval Iconography and Its Sources
L'Art allemand et l'art français du Moyen Âge (1917)
L'Art religieux au XIIe siècle en France (1922) also in English, Princeton 1978
Art et artistes du Moyen Âge (1927), also in English, Black Swan Books, 1986 Art and Artists of the Middle Ages
L'Art religieux après le Concile de Trente, étude sur l'iconographie de la fin du XVIe, du XVIIe et du XVIIIe siècles en Italie, en France, en Espagne et en Flandre (1932)
Rome et ses vieilles églises (1942) trans. The Early Churches of Rome, Ernest Benn Ltd., London 1960.
Les Mosaïques chrétiennes primitives du IVe au VIIe siècle (1943)
L'Art religieux du XIIe au XVIIIe siècle (1945) and English translation: Religious Art from the Twelfth to the Eighteenth Century
Jean Bourdichon: les Heures d'Anne de Bretagne à la Bibliothèque nationale (1946)
Les Grandes Heures de Rohan (1947)
Notre-Dame de Chartres (1948) also in English, Chartres, Harper & Row, 1983
La Fin du paganisme en Gaule et les plus anciennes basiliques chrétiennes (1950)
La Cathédrale d'Albi (1950)
Histoire de l'art (2 volumes, 1950, editor)
Les Saints Compagnons du Christ (1958, posthumous publication)

References

Further reading
Gilberte Émile-Mâle, Émile Mâle. Souvenirs et correspondence de jeunesse, Nonette : Éditions CRÉER, 2002

External links
 Biography 
 The Gothic Cathedral, excerpts by Émile Mâle
 Website of the Académie française
 L'art religieux du XIIIe siècle en France (Google eBook), 1898 

1862 births
1954 deaths
People from Allier
Academic staff of the University of Paris
French art historians
French medievalists
Grand Officiers of the Légion d'honneur
Members of the Académie des Inscriptions et Belles-Lettres
Members of the Académie Française
French male non-fiction writers
Members of the Institute for Catalan Studies
Corresponding Fellows of the Medieval Academy of America
Corresponding Fellows of the British Academy